Arborescence refers to any tree-like structure. It may also refer to:

 Arborescence (graph theory)
 Arborescence (album), a 1994 album by Ozric Tentacles
 Arborescence, a 2013 album by Aaron Parks